Lambert High School is a public high school in Suwanee, in Forsyth County, Georgia, United States. It is the one of eight high schools in the Forsyth County School District. The school has an annual enrollment of about 3,000 students. Most students who attend Lambert reside in southern Forsyth County, an affluent area located between Johns Creek, Suwanee, and Cumming. Lambert was built to alleviate over-crowding at South Forsyth High School, which is located 3.8 miles away on Peachtree Parkway.

History
Lambert High School is named after Clarence Lambert. He was born in Birmingham, Alabama. He received degrees in vocational agriculture from University of Georgia and  a master's degree in school administration from Alabama Polytechnic Institute, now Auburn University. He served as the first principal of Forsyth County High School, which is now called Forsyth Central High School. Lambert also worked at the Georgia Department of Education as a program coordinator, as Assistant Superintendent in charge of facilities at Forsyth County Schools, and as Interim Superintendent of Forsyth County Schools.

An addition is currently being constructed by Charles Beall Constitution Company, Inc.

Student data
Students are drawn from Riverwatch Middle School and South Forsyth Middle School.

Demographics 
During the 2021–22 school year, Lambert had an enrollment of 2,941 students. The student body was 44.2% Asian, 42.7% White, 6.1% Hispanic, 3.8% Black, 3.0% Two or More Races, 0.2% Native American, and 0.1% Pacific Islander.

Student statistics 
For the 2015–2016 school year, Lambert's Graduation Rate was 98.7%.

Lambert's class of 2016 had an average ACT composite score of 24.9, and an average SAT total (combined) score of 1627.

Academic competitions
In 2011, Rocketry Team 2 won runner-up in the national Team America Rocketry Challenge with an overall score of 23. In 2022, Lambert's quizbowl team won the PACE National Scholastic Championship. In 2022, Lambert iGEM won the Grand Prize in the high school division.

Athletics
Lambert competes in Region 5 of classification AAAAAAA, the largest classification in Georgia. The school is a member of the Georgia High School Association. Sports teams at Lambert include competitive cheerleading, cross country, football, softball, volleyball, basketball, swim and dive, wrestling, baseball, golf, lacrosse, soccer, tennis, track and field, fencing and gymnastics. Lambert has a live mascot named Louie the Longhorn.

State championships 
As of May 2018, Lambert has won a total of 24 team state championships. Lambert also won the Georgia Directors' Cup, awarded to the best overall athletics program in the state, in 2015, 2016, 2017, and 2020.

Notable alumni 
 Seth Beer – MLB player for the Arizona Diamondbacks

References

External links
 
 List of Lambert football players who went on to play major college football

Public high schools in Georgia (U.S. state)
Schools in Forsyth County, Georgia
Educational institutions established in 2009
2009 establishments in Georgia (U.S. state)